Curracloe is a village in County Wexford, a few miles northeast of the town of Wexford, Ireland. It lies on the R742 regional road at the junction with R743, and is linked to the long and sandy Curracloe Strand (beach) by the short R743 road,  to the east. Curracloe sees an influx of holiday travellers every summer, who stay in bed & breakfast inns, mobile homes and caravan parks.

Beach
Ballinesker Beach and Curracloe Strand, Ballinesker, were used for the filming of the D-Day sequence in Saving Private Ryan, due to similarity to Omaha Beach in Normandy. Filming began 27 June 1997, and lasted for two months. The village of Curracloe lacked three-phase electricity but when the film company decided to film there, it was connected.
Curracloe Strand was also used for the Irish beach scene in the movie Brooklyn.

See also
 List of towns and villages in Ireland

References

Towns and villages in County Wexford
Beaches of County Wexford